John Edward Gray, FRS  (12 February 1800 – 7 March 1875) was a British zoologist. He was the elder brother of zoologist George Robert Gray and son of the pharmacologist and botanist Samuel Frederick Gray (1766–1828).  The same is used for a zoological name.

Gray was keeper of zoology at the British Museum in London from 1840 until Christmas 1874, before the natural history holdings were split off to the Natural History Museum. He published several catalogues of the museum collections that included comprehensive discussions of animal groups and descriptions of new species. He improved the zoological collections to make them amongst the best in the world.

Biography
Gray was born in Walsall, but his family soon moved to London, where Gray studied medicine. He assisted his father in writing The Natural Arrangement of British Plants (1821). After being blackballed by the Linnean Society of London, Gray shifted his interest from botany to zoology. He began his zoological career by volunteering to collect insects for the British Museum at age 15. He officially joined the Zoological Department in 1824 to help John George Children catalog the reptile collection. In some of his early articles, Gray adopted William Sharp Macleay's quinarian system for classifications of molluscs (1824), butterflies (1824), echinoderms (1825), reptiles (1825), and mammals (1825).  In 1840, he took over Children's position as keeper of zoology, which he held for 35 years, publishing well over 1,000 papers. He named many cetacean species, genera, subfamilies, and families.

During this period, he collaborated with Benjamin Waterhouse Hawkins, the noted natural history artist, in producing Gleanings from the Menagerie at Knowsley. The menagerie at Knowsley Hall, near Liverpool, founded by Edward Smith-Stanley, 13th Earl of Derby, at the Stanley ancestral seat, was one of the largest private menageries in Victorian England.

Gray married Maria Emma Smith in 1826. She helped him with his scientific work, especially with her drawings. 

In 1833, Gray was a founder of what became the Royal Entomological Society. 

Gray was a friend of coleopterist Hamlet Clark, and in 1856–57 they sailed on Gray's yacht Miranda to Spain, Algeria, and Brazil. Gray was an accomplished watercolourist, and his landscape paintings illustrate Clark's account of their journeys.

Gray was also interested in postage stamps. On 1 May 1840, the day the Penny Black first went on sale, he purchased several with the intent to save them.

During his 50 years employed at the British Museum, Gray wrote nearly 500 papers, including many descriptions of species new to science. These had been presented to the museum by collectors from around the world, and included all branches of zoology, although Gray usually left the descriptions of new birds to his younger brother and colleague George. Gray was also active in malacology, the study of molluscs. He was an associate of entomologist Eliza Fanny Staveley, supporting her research and reading papers she had prepared to the Linnean and Zoological Societies of London.

John Edward Gray was buried at St Mary's Church, Lewisham.

Taxa named by him and in his honour

Gray was one of the most prolific taxonomists in the history of zoology. He described more than 300 species and subspecies of reptiles, only surpassed by his successors at the British Museum, George A. Boulenger and Albert Günther and American zoologist Edward D. Cope.

Gray described and named numerous marine snails including:
The genus Lithopoma 
The genus Euthria 

Genera named in his honour include:
The snake genus Grayia 
Species and subspecies named in his honour include:

Ardeola grayii  – Indian pond heron
Mesoplodon grayi  – Gray's beaked whale
Crocidura grayi  – Luzon shrew
Ablepharus grayanus 
Delma grayii 
Microlophus grayii 
Naultinus grayii 
Salvelinus grayi 
Tropidophorus grayi 
Trachemys venusta grayi 
Gray's pipefish, also known as the Mud Pipefish or Spiny Pipefish Halicampus grayi is named after him.

See also
 "The New Museum Idea"

Notes

References

Gray's publications (representative list)

1821 : "A natural arrangement of Mollusca, according to their internal structure." London Medical Repository 15 : 229–239.
1821 : "On the natural arrangement of Vertebrose Animals." London Medical Repository 15 : 296–310.
1824 : "A revision of the family Equidae." Zool. J. Lond. 1 : 241–248 pl. 9.
1824 : "On the natural arrangement of the pulmonobranchous Mollusca." Annals of Philosophy, (n.s.) 8 : 107–109.
1824 : "On the arrangement of the Papilionidae." Annals of Philosophy (n.s.) 8: 119–120.
1825 : "A list and description of some species of shells not taken notice of by Lamarck." Annals of Philosophy (n.s.) 9: 407–415.
1825 : "A synopsis of the genera of reptiles and Amphibia, with a description of some new species." Annals of Philosophy (n.s.) 10 : 193–217.
1825 : "An outline of an attempt at the disposition of the Mammalia into tribes and families with a list of the genera apparently appertaining to each tribe." Annals of Philosophy (n.s.) 10 : 337–344.
1825 : "An attempt to divide the Echinida, or sea eggs, into natural families." Annals of Philosophy (n.s.) 10 : 423–431.
1826 : "Vertebrata. Mammalia." (Appendix B in part). pp. 412–415 in King, P. P. (ed.) Narrative of a Survey of the Intertropical and Western Coasts of Australia. Performed between the years 1818 and 1822. With an Appendix, containing various subjects relating to hydrography and natural history. London: J. Murray Vol. 2.
1827 : "Synopsis of the species of the class Mammalia." pp. 1–391 in Baron Cuvier The Animal Kingdom Arranged in Conformity with its Organization, by the Baron (G) Cuvier, with additional descriptions by Edward Griffith and others. (16 vols: 1827–1835). London: George B. Whittaker Vol. 5.
1828 : "Spicilegia Zoologica, or original figures and short systematic descriptions of new and unfigured animals." Pt 1. London: Treuttel, Würtz & Co.
1829 : "An attempt to improve the natural arrangement of the genera of bat, from actual examination; with some observations on the development of their wings." Phil. Mag. (ns) 6 : 28–36.
1830 : "A synopsis of the species of the class Reptilia." pp 1–110 in Griffith, E. The animal kingdom arranged in conformity with its organisation by the Baron Cuvier. London: Whitaker and Treacher and Co. 9 : 481 + 110 p.
1830–1835 : "Illustrations of Indian zoology; chiefly selected from the collection of Major-General Hardwicke, F.R.S..." 20 parts in 2 volumes. Illus. Indian Zool.
1831 : "Description of twelve new genera of fish, discovered by Gen. Hardwicke, in India, the greater part in the British Museum." Zool. Misc.
1831 : "Descriptions of some new genera and species of bats." pp. 37–38 in Gray, J. E. (ed.) The Zoological Miscellany. To Be Continued Occasionally. Pt 1. London: Treuttel, Würtz & Co.
1832 : "Characters of a new genus of Mammalia, and of a new genus and two new species of lizards, from New Holland." Proc. Zool. Soc. Lond. 1832 : 39–40.
1832 : Illustrations of Indian zoology; chiefly selected from the collection of Major-General Hardwicke, vol. 1. Treuttel, Wurtz, Treuttel Jun. & Richter, London.
1834 : "Characters of a new species of bat (Rhinolophus, Geoffr.) from New Holland." Proc. Zool. Soc. Lond. 1834 : 52–53.
1837 : "Description of some new or little known Mammalia, principally in the British Museum Collection." Mag. Nat. Hist. (ns) 1 : 577–587.
1838 : "A revision of the genera of bats (Vespertilionidae), and the description of some new genera and species." Mag. Zool. Bot. 2 : 483–505.
1839 : "Descriptions of some Mammalia discovered in Cuba by W. S. MacLeay, Esq. With some account of their habits, extracted from Mr. MacLeay's notes." Ann. Nat. Hist. 4 : 1–7 pl. 1.
1840 : "A Synopsis of the Genera and Species of the Class Hypostoma (Asterias, Linnaeus)." Ann. Mag. Nat. Hist., 6: 275.
1840-10-16 : "Shells of molluscous animals." In: Synopsis of the contents of the British Museum, ed. 42: 105–152.
1840-11-04 : "Shells of molluscous animals." In: Synopsis of the contents of the British Museum, ed. 42, 2nd printing: 106–156.
 1844:  Catalogue of the Tortoises, Crocodiles, and Amphisbænians, in the Collection of the British Museum.
1845: Catalogue of the Specimens of Lizards in the Collection of the British Museum. London: Trustees of the British Museum. (Edward Newman, printer). xxviii + 289 pp.
1847–11 : "A list of genera of Recent Mollusca, their synonyma and types." Proceedings of the Zoological Society of London, 15: 129–182.
1849 : Catalogue of the Specimens of Snakes in the Collection of the British Museum. Trustees of the British Museum. London. xv + 125 pp.
1850 : Figures of molluscous animals selected from various authors. Etched for the use of students by M. E. Gray. Volume 4. Longman, Brown, Green & Longmans, London. iv + 219 pp.
1850 : Catalogue of the Cetaceans in the Collection of the British Museum (referenced in many works as Cat. B. M. Cetacea)
1855 : Catalogue of Shield Reptiles in the Collection of the British Museum – Part 1, Testudinata (Tortoises).
1860-10 : "On the arrangement of the land pulmoniferous Mollusca into families." Annals and Magazine of Natural History, series 3, 6: 267–269.
1862 : 
1864 : "On the Cetacea which have been observed in the seas surrounding the British Islands" Proceedings of the Zoological Society of London 1864 pages 195–248
1864 : "Revision of the species of Trionychidae found in Asia and Africa, with descriptions of some new species." Proc. Zool. Soc. London 1864: 76–98.
1864 : "Presidential Address", to the Botany and Zoology, including Physiology Section, pp.75–86 in Report of the Thirty-Fourth Meeting of the British Association for the Advancement of Science; Held at Bath in September 1864, London, John Murray, 1865.
1866 : The Genera of Plants. Unpublished fragment with R. A. Salisbury
1870 : Supplement to the Catalogue of Shield Reptiles in the Collection of the British Museum – Part 1, Testudinata (Tortoises).
1872 : Catalogue of Shield Reptiles in the Collection of the British Museum – Part 2, Emydosaureans, Rhynchocephalia, and Amphisbaenians.
1873 : "Notes on Chinese Mud-Tortoises (Trionychidae), with the Description of a new Species sent to the British Museum by Mr Swinhoe, and Observations on the Male Organ of this Family." Annals and Magazine of Natural History, series 4, vol. XII, 1873. pp. 156–161 and Plate V.

Other sources

 Biographies for Birdwatchers – Barbara and Richard Mearns

External links
 
 John Edward Gray, the Indian Pond Heron and Walsall (RSPB Walsall Local Group)
 
 Dr. John Edward Gray, F.R.S. at Biodiversity Heritage Library
 Petit, Richard E. "John Edward Gray (1800–1875): his malacological publications and molluscan taxa." Zootaxa 3214 (2012): 1–125

1800 births
1875 deaths
19th-century British zoologists
British herpetologists
British philatelists
Employees of the Natural History Museum, London
English entomologists
English malacologists
English ornithologists
English taxonomists
English zoologists
Fathers of philately
Fellows of the Royal Society
People from Walsall
Philatelic literature
Scientists from London
Presidents of the Botanical Society of Britain and Ireland